Gears Tactics is a turn-based tactics video game developed by Splash Damage in conjunction with The Coalition and published by Xbox Game Studios. It is a spin-off of the Gears of War franchise and a prequel to the first game. The game was released first for Windows on April 28, 2020 and subsequently for Xbox One and Xbox Series X/S on November 10, 2020.

Gameplay
The game is played from a top-down perspective and is a turn-based tactics title in which players issue commands to a squad of human soldiers to eliminate the hostiles in a map and depending on the mission, complete secondary objectives. Players can freely explore the map without being confined to a grid. Each character can perform three actions, such as taking cover, shooting enemies, or remain in overwatch to shoot any moving enemy in their line of sight. When an enemy unit loses most of its health, a friendly unit can move in and execute the downed enemy, which gives all units an additional action point. Players need to throw grenades to destroy erupting Emergence Holes which spawn more Locust enemies. If a friendly unit is downed, players can revive them to bring them back into battle with reduced health. The game has five distinct character classes, with each having its own unique abilities. The characters can be extensively customized with mods, armours, and they can acquire new skills after they level up. Other than story-important "hero" characters, other friendly units are procedurally generated and should these units die in combat, their deaths will be permanent.

In addition to the main campaign, players can complete different side-missions. At numerous points in the story, the player is required to complete one or more side missions to proceed. After the player finishes the campaign, Veteran Mode will be unlocked. It allows players to remix the campaign missions with different modifiers such as bonus damages and accuracy penalty. The game, however, does not have a multiplayer mode.

Story
One year after Emergence Day, when a subterranean race of creatures known as the Locust Horde emerged on the surface in a campaign to kill every human on the planet of Sera, Coalition of Ordered Governments leader, Chairman Richard Prescott (Liam O'Brien), orders all major cities outside the Jacinto Plateau to be incinerated by the Hammer of Dawn. In addition, the Chairman had sent mop-up detachments in key-cities to eradicate the surviving Locust. One of the mop-up crews was Alpha Squad, stationed in Aldair City. Among them is Pendulum Wars hero, Sgt. Gabriel Diaz (Noshir Dalal), who had demoted himself to working in the motor pool. Mere hours before the Hammer Strikes, he receives orders from Prescott and Major Sid Redburn (Bruce Thomas) to retrieve classified intel files from the CIC building. Sgt. Diaz and Major Redburn find the files that reveal information about a Locust scientist named Ukkon (Jason Spisak), who has been responsible for creating the various creatures the Locust have been using as instruments of war. The Hammer of Dawn then destroys the city of Aldair, but Sgt. Diaz and Major Redburn survive. However, Ukkon destroys the army base bunker and kills everyone. Prescott then orders Diaz to assassinate Ukkon and is granted the rights to do so by any means possible. In need of soldiers for the fight, Sgt. Diaz and Major Redburn set out to rescue one of the mop-up squads, Echo-Five, but discover that Ukkon has been killing the mop-up crews. After rescuing a Stranded group, a militia of civilians who survived the Hammer Strikes from a Locust attack, they also join Alpha Squad who help fix their Mammoth rig. Their leader, Mikayla Dorn (Debra Wilson), a highly qualified civilian engineer, has knowledge of Ukkon's activities and escorts Sgt. Diaz and Major Redburn to the city of Claybourne where Ukkon frequents. Upon spotting Ukkon, Mikayla manages to shoot Ukkon in the face, presumably killing him. Ukkon, however by inhaling an unknown substance, instantly heals himself, stands right back up and summons a Brumak to kill Alpha Squad. Alpha manage to defeat the Brumak by destroying the imulsion tanks mounted on its back. Sgt. Diaz then realizes that the COG is once again holding secrets like before, and fears that they will get them killed.

Angry at Chairman Prescott for withholding information about Ukkon's immortal condition, Sgt. Diaz then relocates his entire squad into the deserts of Vasgar to teach them how to fight and prepare for the battle against Ukkon. Eventually, Alpha discovers an empty canister that Ukkon had used to inhale earlier to heal himself. Mikayla translates the Vasgari inscribed on the canister as belonging to the Nedroma Health Institute. Upon arriving, Mikayla reveals that Nedroma was a quarantine zone and research facility for Rustlung, a fatal condition caused by the exposure to Imulsion fumes. Upon finding Ukkon's stash of canisters, Mikayla reveals that the canisters are full of immune system boosters, but only work against Rustlung, and with devastating side-effects. Realizing Ukkon is dying of Rustlung and in need of the canisters, Sgt. Diaz prepares a trap to lure Ukkon using the immune booster canisters as bait. Alpha Squad is successful in luring Ukkon and capturing him. However, Ukkon reveals to Alpha Squad by recognizing Major Redburn as an old acquaintance. Major Redburn then knocks out Sgt. Diaz and prepares to drive off with Ukkon, alive and imprisoned, back to Ephyra. Mikayla stops him, and Ukkon manages to break free and escape. He proceeds to summon a Corpser to kill Alpha. Alpha successfully defeat it by dropping a beam hanging from a crane on its head. 

Sgt. Diaz and Mikayla then detain Major Redburn, with Chairman Prescott ordering to execute him for treason. Major Redburn then reveals to them that when he was younger, he worked for a genetics lab called the New Hope Research Facility, who, like Nedroma, was trying to cure Rustlung. However, the scientists went mad and used genetic experimentation to try and evolve the patients into greater beings, but instead made monsters: the Locust. Most of the patients lost their minds and went feral, except for Ukkon. Ukkon had also developed the ability to quickly heal to the point of immortality. Major Redburn had safely stashed classified files containing this information located at an outpost in Winlock which Sgt. Diaz and Mikayla retrieve. When Chairman Prescott discovers that Alpha Squad had learned the truth about New Hope and the COG creating the Locust, he attempts to kill them with the Hammer of Dawn to cut any loose ends. With Alpha Squad presumed dead and no longer part of the COG, they decide to stick to their mission of killing Ukkon. Major Redburn also revealed that the scientists at New Hope had created a fail-safe called cytostatic gas that could neutralize Ukkon's healing ability. Major Redburn tells Sgt. Diaz that he can manufacture the gas and have Mikayla weaponize it into a gas grenade. After Mikayla creates the cytostatic gas grenade, Alpha Squad proceed to locate Ukkon's base of operations. Sgt. Diaz believes that Ukkon must be basing his operations out of the province of Zenic, which is the only region not to be raided or destroyed, while not wanting to leave behind any traces regarding his whereabouts. Upon investigating Zenic, Sgt. Diaz rescues a civilian taken as a prisoner of the Locust. She reveals that her father and herself were taking shelter in a nearby laboratory, but Ukkon arrived and transformed it into his own lab. For reasons unknown, he killed her father and everyone else in the lab, sparing her life. She then agrees to divulge the location of the lab to Alpha on the condition that she personally gets to kill Ukkon. Sgt. Diaz agrees to her condition and asks for her name in return, to which she replies is Reyna (Melanie Minichino). Reyna eventually guides Alpha to the location of Ukkon's laboratory following which, all of Alpha and their civilian recruits besiege Ukkon's base. Mikayla weakens Ukkon by tossing a cytostatic gas grenade and wounds him with a few shots. He commands the Locust army to deal with Alpha and retreats inside the lab. While the recruits provide a distraction fighting the Locust army, in the meanwhile Diaz, Redburn, Mikayla and Reyna infiltrate the lab to locate and defeat Ukkon. He reveals himself on his Hydra mount and summons all his reinforcements he has at his disposal to stop Alpha Squad, who eventually defeat Ukkon's army and his Hydra. With his mount defeated, Ukkon, now severely wounded, is shot in the face and killed by Reyna avenging the murder of her father. She then retrieves an amulet from Ukkon and reveals that it belonged to her mother, who she never knew. Now surviving as Stranded, Alpha Squad decides to dedicate themselves to destroying Ukkon's remaining creations.

Development
The game's development was handled by Splash Damage with The Coalition providing assistance. The Coalition wanted to introduce the franchise to a wider audience and the development team identified that there were a lot of similarities between the franchise, which was a series of squad-based third-person shooters with cover-based combat, and turn-based strategy games. According to Alex Grimbley, the game's executive producer, "[the team] actually just took existing Gears and just moved the camera up". The team took four and a half years to develop the game. The game is not related to Gears of War: Tactics, a cancelled spin-off developed by Epic Games.

The team wanted the game to play at a faster pace when compared to other competing games in the genre. Thus the team decided to give each unit three action points instead of two to ensure that players can get to perform various actions within one turn. The team put a large emphasis on the game's narrative, and the team aimed to tell a "personal and emotional story" and invested a lot of resources into creating the game's cutscenes and employing the voice actors. The team consulted 343 Industries, which worked on Halo Wars, a strategy spin-off of the Halo franchise. However, unlike Halo Wars, the game was considered to be a PC premium title instead of a strategy game designed for console owners.

Publisher Xbox Game Studios announced the game at E3 2018, alongside Gears 5 and Gears Pop!. At The Game Awards 2019, Microsoft announced that the game would be released for Windows on April 28, 2020, while Rod Fergusson, the founder of The Coalition, later confirmed that an Xbox One version is being developed. Players who pre-ordered the game would gain access to the "Thrashball Cole" pack, which allows the player to play as Augustus Cole. The game was also released for Xbox Game Pass subscribers at launch.

With the release of the game on Xbox One and Xbox Series X/S on November 10, the game received additional content with the addition of Jacked Mode which introduces Jack as a playable character, new "Deviant" enemies which are tougher variants of their regular counterparts, more powerful "Supreme" weapon modifications and 11 new achievements worth 400 gamerscore.

Reception

The game received generally positive reviews upon release, according to review aggregator Metacritic.

Destructoid called the game "...a great Gears game and a great tactics game", stating, "The core — getting onto the battlefield and agonizing over every move — is excellent." Game Informer criticized the game's stilted pacing caused by an excess of repetitive and stale side missions, but ultimately concluded that it was "...a solid new front in the Gears theater of war." GameSpot and GamesRadar+ praised the Gears aesthetics, strong character customization, meaningful character progression, and innovative tweaks to the modern RPG formula, while criticizing the filler story and lack of mission diversity. IGN praised the game's graphics and animations, writing, "Character models are fantastically detailed and the ruined, mostly urban environments of the planet Sera are elaborate. Animations are top-notch as well...", criticized the user interface for not providing enough information, and concluded that while the campaign went on to wear out its welcome, it was strong, "...with some clever, Gears-appropriate ideas". PC Gamer criticized the narrative, side missions, and bosses, writing, "Each of the campaign's three acts ends with a setpiece boss battle, which is an exciting thing to have in a tactics game. Unfortunately all three bosses use essentially the same mechanics and they don't change throughout the fights...", while praising the combat, skill system, and top-notch presentation. PCGamesN wrote, "Gears Tactics simply does not have enough variety in its environments, missions, or enemies to keep the campaign feeling fresh...It’s a shame, because given a little more ambition and variety, Gears Tactics would be something truly special." 

It was nominated for the category of Best Sim/Strategy game at The Game Awards 2020.

References

External links
 

2020 video games
Dystopian video games
Gears of War
Splash Damage games
Tactical role-playing video games
Turn-based tactics video games
Unreal Engine games
Video game prequels
Video game spin-offs
Video games developed in Canada
Video games developed in the United Kingdom
Video games set on fictional planets
Windows games
Xbox Cloud Gaming games
Xbox One games
Xbox Series X and Series S games
The Coalition games